Anne Colley (born 14 July 1951) is a former Irish politician who served as a Teachta Dála (TD) for the Dublin South constituency from 1987 to 1989.

Background

Colley was born in Dublin in 1951. She studied law at University College Dublin (UCD) and qualified as a solicitor. Her father George Colley, who was a senior Fianna Fáil politician, was closely aligned with Progressive Democrats (PD) founder Desmond O'Malley, in the anti-Charles Haughey wing of the Fianna Fáil party. Her grandfather Harry Colley, was also a TD.

Career
She first entered national politics as one of 14 Progressive Democrat TDs elected to Dáil Éireann at the 1987 general election, the first election after the party was founded. She was elected for the Dublin South constituency. The party proved popular, surpassing the Labour Party, to become the third-biggest party in the Dáil.

Colley was appointed party Spokesperson on Institutional Reform, Labour and the Public Service. In 1988, she became Spokesperson on Justice. She lost her seat at the 1989 general election and retired from politics.

Colley Report
In 2006, she was appointed by then Minister for Justice Michael McDowell, to chair a working group on Civil unions in Ireland. Officially called the Options Paper on Cohabiting Couples, (2006) (Dept of Justice, Equality and Law Reform), the paper became known as the Colley Report.

References

Living people
1951 births
Alumni of University College Dublin
Anne
Members of the 25th Dáil
Politicians from County Dublin
Progressive Democrats TDs
20th-century women Teachtaí Dála